Dermot Fitzpatrick (12 April 1940 – 23 March 2022) was an Irish Fianna Fáil politician who served as a Teachta Dála (TD) for the Dublin Central constituency from 1987 to 1992 and from 2002 to 2007. He was a Senator from 1997 to 2002, after being nominated by the Taoiseach.

He was a native of Dublin, and was educated at Coláiste Mhuire, an Irish language secondary school in the city, and at University College Dublin, from which he graduated with a degree in medicine. Prior to his entry into politics, he worked as a family doctor.

He retired at the 2007 general election. His daughter Mary Fitzpatrick was one of three Fianna Fáil candidates in Dublin Central for the 2007 general election. She did not get elected.

References

 

1940 births
2022 deaths
Local councillors in Dublin (city)
Fianna Fáil TDs
Members of the 25th Dáil
Members of the 26th Dáil
Members of the 21st Seanad
Members of the 29th Dáil
People educated at Coláiste Mhuire, Dublin
Alumni of University College Dublin
Irish general practitioners
Nominated members of Seanad Éireann
Fianna Fáil senators